Eshmun (or Eshmoun, less accurately Esmun or Esmoun;  ;  Yasumunu) was a Phoenician god of healing and the tutelary god of Sidon.

History

This god was known at least from the Iron Age period at Sidon and was worshipped also in Tyre, Beirut, Cyprus, Sardinia, and in Carthage where the site of Eshmun's temple is now occupied by the acropolium of Carthage.

According to Eusebius of Caesarea, Phoenician author Sanchuniathon wrote that Sydyk, 'The Righteous', first fathered seven sons equated with the Greek Cabeiri or Dioscuri, no mother named, and then afterwards fathered an eighth son by one of the seven Titanides or Artemides. (See Kotharat). The name Eshmun appears to mean 'the Eighth'.

The Neo-Platonist Damascius also stated

Photius (Bibliotheca Codex 242) summarizes Damascius as saying further that Asclepius of Beirut was a youth who was fond of hunting. He was seen by the goddess Astronoë (thought by many scholars to be a version of ‘Ashtart) who so harassed him with amorous pursuit that in desperation he castrated himself and died. Astronoë then named the youth Paeon 'Healer',  restored him to life from the warmth of her body, and changed him into a god. A village near Beirut named Qabr Shmoun, "Eshmoun's grave," still exists.

A trilingual inscription of the 2nd century BCE from Sardinia also identifies Eshmun with the Greek Asclepius and the Latin Aesculapius.
Pausanias quotes a Sidonian as saying that the Phoenicians claim Apollo as the father of Asclepius, as do the Greeks, but unlike them do not make his mother a mortal woman. The Sidonian then continued with an allegory which explained that Apollo represented the sun, whose changing path imparts to the air its healthiness which is to be understood as Asclepius. This allegory seems likely a late invention. Also, Apollo is usually equated with the Phoenician plague god Resheph. This might be a variant version of Eshmun's parentage, or Apollo might also be equated with Sadyk, and Sadyk might be equated with Resheph.

In Cyprus, Eshmun was syncretized with Melqart, and also in Ibiza, as given by a dedication reciting: "to his lord, Eshmun-Melqart".

The name Astresmunim ("herb of Eshmun") was applied by Dioscorides to the solanum, which was regarded as having medicinal qualities.

Worship
The temple to Eshmun is found one km from Sidon on the Bostrenus River, the modern River Awwali. Building was begun at the end of the 6th century BCE during the reign of Eshmunazar II, and later additions were made up into the Roman period.  It was excavated by Maurice Dunand in 1963-1978. Many votive offerings were found in the form of statues of persons healed by the god, especially babies and young children.

Also found near the Sidon temple was a gold plaque of Eshmun and the goddess Hygeia (meaning "Health") showing Eshmun holding a staff in his right hand around which a serpent is entwined.  A coin of the 3rd century CE from Beirut shows Eshmun standing between two serpents.

Bterram, a village in Lebanon, possesses a very old underground temple called Eshmunit, comprising eight rooms (one large and seven small), carved into the bedrock and accessible by stairs. It is thought this may be a temple to a spouse of Eshmun.

See also

 Delos

References

Bibliography
.

.

.

External links
 Temple of Eshmun near Sidon
 Lebmania: Eshmoun
 Atlas Tours: Lebanon: Eshmun
 Ikama: Eshmoun
 Bterram: Eshmunit (On the temple of Eshmunit in Bterram.)

West Semitic gods
Tutelary deities
Health gods
Phoenician mythology
Temple of Eshmun